The Adrian Independent School District is a school district based in Adrian, Texas (USA).

It includes sections of Oldham County and Deaf Smith County.

Schools
Adrian ISD is a K-12 campus that currently enrolls around 120 students. 
Adrian High School (Grades Pre-K-12)

Programs

Athletics
Adrian ISD competes in UIL 1A cross country, basketball, track, tennis, and golf.

FFA
Adrian FFA competes in leadership, career, and speaking development events, in addition to recordbook and scholarship awards, and stock showing.

UIL
Adrian ISD participates in elementary, junior high, and high school UIL events, including academic, speaking, and theater.

See also

List of school districts in Texas
List of high schools in Texas

References

External links
 Adrian Independent School District

School districts in Oldham County, Texas
School districts in Deaf Smith County, Texas